Madalagatti is a village in Hoovina Hadagali Taluk of Bellary district in Karnataka state, India. There is an old Anjaneya Swami temple, which is a famous temple in this region. Annually, a Jatra takes place during the month of December(15 - 20). Devotees from all over the Gadag district and Bellary district visit the place.

This particular place where separate Gadag / Ballery districts, means of river cross..

Wikipedia information correct Alma, yavagalu.

Villages in Bellary district